C-Body may refer to:

 Chrysler C platform, rear wheel drive full-size cars 
 GM C platform (1925), full-size rear-wheel-drive upscale and luxury cars
 General Motors C platform (1985), full-size front-wheel-drive upscale and luxury cars